René Muñoz Padín (born January 2, 1925, in Las Marías, Puerto Rico and died on March 8, 2011, in Hato Rey, Puerto Rico) was a Puerto Rican politician who served Puerto Rico Senate and in the Puerto Rico House of Representatives.

Early years
He was born in town of Las Marias on January 2, 1925. Later moved to San Juan to study law.

Political career
Muñoz Padín was an assistant to the then mayor of San Juan, Felisa Rincón de Gautier, and press director to the then president of the Senate Miguel Hernández Agosto. He was elected to the Puerto Rico House of Representatives from the 5th District from 1953 to 1961 and to the Puerto Rico Senate for the San Juan District from 1965 to 1969. He was also president of the Association of Retirees of the Government of Puerto Rico.

Before joining the Popular Democratic Party (PPD), in the 50s, Muñoz Padín had been a member of the Nationalist Party of Puerto Rico.

Death
He died on March 8, 2011, at Auxilio Mutuo Hospital in Hato Rey, Puerto Rico after suffering an long time illness, he was age 86. He was buried at Cementerio Borinquen Memorial in Caguas, Puerto Rico.

References

20th-century Puerto Rican politicians
1925 births
2011 deaths
Members of the Senate of Puerto Rico
People from Las Marías, Puerto Rico
Popular Democratic Party members of the House of Representatives of Puerto Rico
Popular Democratic Party (Puerto Rico) politicians